Dadeland South station is a transfer station on the Metrorail rapid transit system in the Dadeland district of Kendall, Florida. It is the southern terminus of the Metrorail system and the northern terminus of the South Dade TransitWay (a BRT corridor). It is the southernmost passenger rail station in the Continental United States. This station is located near the intersection of Dadeland Boulevard and Datran Boulevard, adjacent to South Dixie Highway (US 1), three blocks southwest of Kendall Drive and Dadeland Mall, and just east of the US 1–Palmetto Expressway (SR 826) junction. It opened to service May 20, 1984.

The station serves Downtown Dadeland as well as local shopping centers Dadeland Mall and Town Center One.

Station layout
The station has two tracks served by an island platform.

References

External links

MDT – Metrorail Stations
 Station from Dadeland Boulevard from Google Map Street View

Green Line (Metrorail)
Orange Line (Metrorail)
Metrorail (Miami-Dade County) stations in Miami-Dade County, Florida
Railway stations in the United States opened in 1984
1984 establishments in Florida
Kendall, Florida